Avatha tepescens is a species of moth of the family Erebidae. It is found in Sundaland.

References

External links

Moths described in 1858
Avatha
Moths of Asia